Samuel Rastall (1749–1781) was an Anglican priest in Ireland in the Eighteenth Century.

Rastall was born in Newark-on-Trent and educated at Peterhouse, Cambridge. He was Dean of Killaloe from 1780 until his death.

Notes

1749 births
1781 deaths
Alumni of Peterhouse, Cambridge
Deans of Killaloe
18th-century Irish Anglican priests
People from Newark-on-Trent